Nazik al-Malaika (23 August 1923 – 20 June 2007) was an Iraqi poet. Al-Malaika is noted for being among the first Arabic poets to use free verse.

Early life and career

Al-Malaika was born in Baghdad to a cultured family. Her mother was also a poet, and her father was a teacher. She wrote her first poem at the age of 10. Al-Malaika graduated in 1944 from the College of Arts in Baghdad and later completed a master's degree in comparative literature at the University of Wisconsin–Madison with a Degree of Excellence. She entered the Institute of Fine Arts and graduated from the Department of Music in 1949. In 1959 she earned a Master of Arts in Comparative Literature from the University of Wisconsin–Madison in the United States, and she was appointed professor at the University of Baghdad, the University of Basrah, and Kuwait University.

Career
Al-Malaika taught at a number of schools and universities, most notably at the University of Mosul.

Leaving Iraq
Al-Malaika left Iraq in 1970 with her husband Abdel Hadi Mahbooba and family, following the rise of the Arab Socialist Ba'ath Party of Iraq to power. She lived in Kuwait until Saddam Hussein's invasion in 1990. Al-Malaika and her family left for Cairo, where she lived for the rest of her life. Towards the end of her life, al-Malaika suffered from a number of health issues, including Parkinson's disease.

She died in Cairo in 2007 at the age of 83.

Works
One of her poems, Medinat al Hub, inspired the Iraqi artist and scholar, Issam al-Said to produce an artwork with the same name.  Al-Malaika published several books of poems:
 her first book of poetry, "The Nights Lover", after her graduation.
 She wrote a poem, "The Cholera", which is considered by critics as a revolution in the Arabic poem in 1947.
 "Shrapnel and Ashes" followed in 1949.
 She published "Bottom of the Wave" in 1957.
 her final volume "Tree of the Moon" being published in 1968.
 "The sea changes its color" in 1977

Translation in other languages

English 
Emily Drumsta translated a selection of Al-Malaika's poems into English, collected in a book titled Revolt Under The Sun.

Nepali 
Some of Al-Malaika's poems were translated into Nepali by Suman Pokhrel, and collected along with the works of other poets in an anthology titled Manpareka Kehi Kavita.

See also
 Iraqi art
 List of Iraqi artists
Amal Al Zahawi

References

Bibliography

External links
  official site
 flash for her at aljazeera
  news at arabicnews

1923 births
2007 deaths
University of Wisconsin–Madison College of Letters and Science alumni
Iraqi emigrants to Kuwait
20th-century Iraqi poets
Iraqi women writers
Writers from Baghdad
Iraqi writers
Iraqi Shia Muslims
Academic staff of the University of Baghdad
Academic staff of the University of Basrah
Academic staff of Kuwait University
Iraqi women poets
Arabic-language women poets
Arabic-language poets
20th-century women writers
21st-century Iraqi poets
Iraqi expatriates in the United States
Iraqi expatriates in Kuwait
Iraqi expatriates in Egypt